Heritage School or The Heritage School may refer to:

 Heritage School, Cambridge, an independent day school in Cambridge, Cambridgeshire, England
 Heritage School, Pune, a boarding school in Pune, Maharashtra, India
 The Heritage School, Kolkata, a private day & boarding school in Kolkata, West Bengal, India
 The Heritage School, Newnan, a private day school in Newnan, Georgia, U.S.
 Heritage School System, an English-medium day school in Lahore, Punjab, Pakistan
 The Heritage Private School, a British international school in Limassol, Limassol District, Cyprus
 Chailey Heritage School, North Chailey, East Sussex, England

See also
 American Heritage School (disambiguation)
 Christian Heritage School (disambiguation)
 Heritage (disambiguation)
 Heritage Academy (disambiguation)
 Heritage Christian School (disambiguation)
 Heritage College (disambiguation)
 Heritage High School (disambiguation)